Epacris celata is a species of flowering plant in the heath family Ericaceae and is endemic to south-eastern continental Australia. It is a spreading to erect shrub with flat, elliptic to egg-shaped leaves with the narrower end towards the base, and tube-shaped white flowers clustered in upper leaf axils.

Description
The five stamens and the style are enclosed in the petal tube.

Taxonomy and naming
Epacris celata was first formally described in 1995 by R.K.Crowden in the journal, Muelleria from specimens collected on the Bogong High Plains in 1993. The specific epithet (celata) means "concealed", because the plant is hidden with other species and is only noticed when flowering.

Distribution and habitat
This epacris grows in alpine heath in wet places or near streams on higher mountains of the Bogong High Plains in Victoria and near Mount Kosciuszko and in Wadbilliga National Park in New South Wales.

References

celata
Ericales of Australia
Flora of New South Wales
Victoria (Australia)
Plants described in 1995
Endemic flora of Australia